The United People's Movement was a political party in Saint Vincent and the Grenadines. It first contested national elections in 1979, when it received 13.6% of the vote, but failed to win a seat. Shortly before the 1984 elections several members left to form the Movement for National Unity after a majority of UPM members refused to renounce the policies of Fidel Castro. As a result, the party's vote share fell to 3.2% and it remained seatless. In 1989 it received just 468 votes and again failed to win a seat. It did not contest any further elections.

Electoral history

House of Assembly elections

References 

Political parties in Saint Vincent and the Grenadines
Defunct socialist parties in North America